The Citroën Méhari is a lightweight recreational and utility vehicle, manufactured and marketed by French carmaker Citroën over 18 years in a single generation. Built in front-wheel (1968–1988) and four-wheel drive (1980–1983) variants, it features ABS plastic bodywork with optional/removable doors and foldable, stowable, fabric convertible top. 

The car also uses the Dyane's headlights and bezels, and 4WD units differ externally by having the spare wheel on the hood, in a molded recess.

The car is named after the fast-running dromedary camel, the méhari, which can be used for racing or transport. Citroën manufactured 144,953 Méharis between the car's French launch in May 1968 and the end of production in 1988. 

The Méhari and variants were built in many additional variants (under license or not), in a host of other countries, including versions with a fiberglass instead of ABS body, and 2WD version with spare wheel on the hood.

Production History

Origin

The Méhari was designed by French World War II fighter ace Count Roland de la Poype, who headed the French company SEAB - Société d'Etudes et d'Applications des Brevets. He developed the idea of using a plastic, rather than fiberglass body. De la Poype evaluated the fashionable Mini Moke, noting its low ground clearance, hard suspension and rust-prone body.

This company was already a supplier to Citroën, and SEAB developed a working concept of the car before presenting it to its client.

French Military
The French Army purchased 7,064 Méharis – some of which were modified to have 24 V electric power to operate the two way radio.

Méhari 4x4
In 1979, Citroën launched the Méhari 4x4 with drive to all four wheels. Unlike the Citroën 2CV Sahara 4x4, this car had only one engine, rather than one engine per axle.

The body is distinguished by its spare wheel mounted on the specially designed bonnet, its additional bumpers, front and rear, its flared wheel arches (for 1982), big optional tyres (for 1982) and tail lights similar to the Citroën Acadiane van.
The 4x4 version has a gearbox with four normal speeds and a three-speed transfer gearbox for crossing slopes up to 60%. At the time, the Méhari 4x4 was one of the few 4x4s with four-wheel independent suspension. The car had all wheel disc brakes.

Méhari 4x4 production stopped in 1983. It cost twice as much as the standard 4x2 car.

Limited editions
Two limited edition versions of the Méhari were sold: 
  'Azur' : initially planned in a limited edition of 700 copies, the  Mehari Azur  was then integrated into the "normal" range given the great success achieved. The  Azur  was distinguished from the other  Méhari  by its white body with blue doors, grille and soft top. The seats were upholstered in blue and white striped fabric.
  'Plage' : at the same time as the  Azur  the  Plage  series was introduced, reserved for the markets of the Iberian Peninsula. The car, produced in Mangualde, in Portugal (where a new production node for the  Méhari  had been activated). It was characterized by a yellow body with white rims.

International production and sales

Belgium

The VanClee company made a number of fiberglass kit-cars. Their models 'Emmet' and 'Mungo' were based on the Citroën A-series platform and mechanicals, and was directly related to the Méhari.

Germany

The Méhari was never type approved for sale in Germany, because the ABS body is flammable at 400 degrees C. In 1975, German fiberglass kit car specialist Fiberfab developed the Sherpa, using Citroën delivered platforms, and sold 250 units.

Irish Military
Citroën Méhari was also in service with the Irish Defence Forces, which bought a total of 12 vehicles in the late 1970s; most were sold at auction about 1985, but one is retained at the Defence Forces Training Centre in the Curragh Camp, County Kildare, Ireland.

Portugal 
The Méhari was produced at the Mangualde factory, where it built 17,500 copies.

Spain 
The Méhari was produced at the Vigo factory from late 1969 to 1980, of which 12,480 copies were produced. Imported models would continue to be marketed until 1987.

UK 
The Méhari was never type approved for sale in the UK. The 2CV on which it was based also had a gap in UK sales, from 1961 to 1974.

United States

Citroen marketed the Méhari in the United States for model years 1969–1970, where the vehicle was classified as a truck.  As trucks had far more lenient National Highway Traffic Safety Administration safety standards than passenger cars in the US, the Méhari could be sold without seat belts. Budget Rent-A-Car offered them as rentals in Hawaii. Hearst Castle, in San Simeon, California, used them as groundskeeper cars.

Elvis Presley featured a US Model Méhari prominently in his 1973 broadcast Aloha from Hawaii Via Satellite

Revisions for the US market included:
Altered front panel with larger 7" sealed-beam headlamps
Lateral side marker lights
Special boot lid with room for US registration plate and a lamp (Lucas) either side of it.
Straight rear bumper.
Two-speed wiper motor.
Reversing lights.
Hexagonal yellow "cats eyes" on front and rear sides.

Argentina and Uruguay 

The Méhari was manufactured in two different periods: 1971 to 1980 by Citroën Argentina SA with 3,997 units produced. Citroën left Argentina following the collapse of the economy in the late 1970s.

The IES company (Industrias Eduardo Sal-Lari) in 1984 resurrected the model, this time under the name  Safari  or Gringa until 1986, maintaining practically all the technical characteristics of the original model, but with flared wheel arches and big tires. The spare wheel was mounted on the hood, thus gaining luggage space. Contrary to French units with the spare on the hood, these were only front-wheel drive.

The Argentine Méhari used the "3CV" (Citroën Ami) platform, with all its mechanics. Consequently it had drum brakes, and not discs, like its French predecessor. The bodywork also had differences, due to the fiberglass, since there was no machinery to model plastics of this size. The body of the Argentine Méhari was manufactured in Uruguay by Dasur, and the chassis were sent from Argentina so that the Nordex company could make the assembly. 

In 1971 at the time of its presentation, the only color was red, although later some were made blue for the police of  Tucumán. Coinciding with the launch of the 3CV M-28 in 1978, the Méhari II was launched, distinguished by its widened rims and its orange color.

This Uruguayan version of the Méhari was manufactured under license by the firm Nordex, and had a fiberglass body – instead of the French original ABS plastic (also used for refrigerator interiors). Equipment to heat ABS sheet material, and then cut with a refrigerated die, did not yet exist in Uruguay. It was decided to make the same vehicle using fiberglass reinforced polyester. Otherwise, it was mostly similar to its French sister, but the rear wheel arches have a different shape and are noticeably larger; it also featured a removable hardtop. 14,000 units were built.  Of the 14,000 units, 5,000 remained in Uruguay and 9,000 went to Argentina within the CAUCE agreement.
Some Méharis, built in Uruguay, were sold in Argentina under the name of Naranja Mecanica ("Mechanical orange").

Baby Brousse & FAF

Citroën built metal-bodied variants of the A-Series, in many ways steel-bodied Méharis, in many countries around the world, including the Baby Brousse and the Citroën FAF.

Developed in Chile in the year 1971 and produced between 1972 and 1974, the FAF Yagán version was inspired by the French Mèhari. At first, the possibility of importing the Mehari bodywork from Uruguay was considered, but its high price discouraged those responsible for the project. Despite being an artisanal vehicle – the Yagán was made entirely by hand and no type of dies or molds were used – some 1,500 units were produced at its factory in Arica, where other Citroën vehicles were also assembled, such as the Ami 8 and the 2CV. Distinctive about the Yagán was that the base chassis was that of the Citroën 2CV rather than the Méhari, and that the goal of 50% Chilean componentry was reached.

Post-production

The Méhari ended production in 1988 with no replacement. This left a gap in the market, that others have tried to address.

Teilhol

The Teilhol company, which had been building the recently defunct Renault Rodeo, created the Tangara using 2CV mechanicals, with bolt-on pre-dyed GRP panels. It also created a Citroën AX-based model. The company ceased operations in 1990.

Chassis Restorations
Due to its mechanical simplicity, the Méhari can easily be restored to "as new" condition; all parts including the chassis are easily available, creating a thriving restoration market.

Cassis Electric Méhari
Méhari Club Cassis, a specialist based in the South of France, has been rebuilding the cars for many years, and as of 2019 sells brand new Méhari cars with an electric powertrain. These qualify for exemption from French new car regulations (for the vintage 1968 design) as long as the car is not driven on the motorway (voitures sans permis).

Factory Electric Méhari

The factory began selling a new electric car, the Citroën E-Méhari in 2016.

Colours
The car's colour was integrated into the ABS plastic during production, with limited colour choices. One colour, Vert Montana, remained a choice throughout the car's entire production span. Except for the limited edition Azur, the official names of colours all refer to desert regions.

As ultraviolet sunlight degrades the colourfastness of ABS plastic, unrestored cars have sometimes faded. New bodies for restorations are available in various original colours.

Sales figures

Criminal activity
In 1973–1974, 63 Citroën Méharis were burned by an arsonist in Paris for unknown reasons.

 In 1985, the Neapolitan journalist Giancarlo Siani was murdered, hit 10 times in the head by two hitmen sent by the Camorra while in his Méhari, green with a black canvas top. Between October and December 2013, Siani's Méhari made a trip from Naples to Brussels, passing through Rome, in order to remember the life of this journalist, like all the other journalists killed by the mafia.

See also
BMC Mini Moke
Volkswagen Type 181
Fiat Ghia Jolly
Renault Rodeo

References

External links

Méhari at Citroenet
Méhari links at Citroën World
Restored Mehari in France
Méhari modelcars
IMCDB.org

Mehari
Mehari
Cars powered by boxer engines
Off-road vehicles
Mini sport utility vehicles
Convertibles
Copolymers
Plastics
Thermoplastics
Engineering plastic

Website mehari-expo belgium